Michael Lercher (born 6 January 1996) is an Austrian footballer.

Club career
On 21 August 2020, he signed with SV Ried.

References

External links
 
 

1996 births
Living people
Austrian footballers
Association football defenders
Austria youth international footballers
Austria under-21 international footballers
FC Wacker Innsbruck (2002) players
SV Mattersburg players
SV Ried players
Austrian Football Bundesliga players
2. Liga (Austria) players
Austrian expatriate sportspeople in Germany
SV Werder Bremen players
Expatriate footballers in Germany
Austrian expatriate footballers